This is a list of Weber State Wildcats football players in the NFL Draft.

Key

Selections

See also
List of Weber State University people

References

Weber State

Weber State Wildcats NFL Draft